Hans Riemer (2 August 1901 – 26 December 1963) was an Austrian politician of the Social Democratic Party of Austria (SPÖ). From 1949 to 1956 he was a member of the Bundesrat and from 1956 to 1963 a member of the city council of Vienna.

Background 
Riemer was born in Steyr, the son of a craftsman. He attended school in Vienna and completed a commercial apprenticeship. In 1918 he joined the Socialist Workers Youth, rose to local group chairman and was from 1922 to 1926 chairman of the Vienna State organization. In 1922, Josef Luitpold Stern brought him to the Socialist Education Center, where he built the department of photography and film and led it until 1932. Between 1932 and 1934, Riemer worked as a secretary of the Social Democratic municipal council and the Austrian Town Covenant (Österreichischer Städtebund). Riemer also worked as an editor of the paper "Österreichische Gemeinde-Zeitung".

After the prohibition of the Social Democratic Party, Riemer worked between 1934 and 1943 as an official at the Wiener Städtische Versicherung, an insurance company. He was subsequently drafted to military service, and returned in 1945 from a short American captivity. He became press secretary of the city of Vienna, and wrote a brochure Ewiges Wien in that capacity. In 1948, he was also appointed secretary of the Austrian Town Covenant again. Riemer, who held this office until 1957, was also a member of the Bundesrat between 5 December 1949 and 5 July 1956. He served as president between 1 January 1955 and 20 June 1955.

In addition, Riemer was from 11 December 1959 until his death a member of the Vienna city council (Stadtrat) and a member of the Vienna municipal council (Gemeinderat).

Riemer was buried in a grave of honor in the Vienna Central Cemetery (Group 14C, No. 25).

Publications 

References

External links 
 

Recipients of the Decoration for Services to the Republic of Austria
Social Democratic Party of Austria politicians
Presidents of the Austrian Federal Council
Members of the Federal Council (Austria)
Politicians from Vienna
1901 births
1963 deaths
People from Steyr
German prisoners of war in World War II held by the United States